Siri Arun Budcharern (born 12 January 2002) is a freestyle swimmer from Laos. She competed at the 2016 Summer Olympics in the Women's 50 m freestyle and finished 76th with a time of 32.55 seconds. She did not advance to the semifinals, which required a top 16 finish in the heats.

Leading up to the Games, Budcharern trained in a 25 m public pool in Vientiane, half the length of an Olympic-sized venue. She had to share the pool with children taking swimming lessons while the pool deck was often covered with beer bottles from parties.

References

External links
 

Olympic swimmers of Laos
Swimmers at the 2016 Summer Olympics
2002 births
Living people
People from Vientiane
Swimmers at the 2018 Asian Games
Asian Games competitors for Laos
Laotian female freestyle swimmers
Swimmers at the 2020 Summer Olympics